The Alfred Dunk House (also known as the Brinker House) is a historic house located in Binghamton, Broome County, New York.

Description and history 
It was built in about 1853 or 1854, and is a two-story plus attic, wood-framed house built over a stone basement. It is distinguished by the extremely steep pitch of its gable, which is decorated with scroll sawn bargeboards and surmounted by its original finial and pendant in the Carpenter Gothic style.

It was listed on the National Register of Historic Places on March 21, 1985.

References

External links

Historic American Buildings Survey in New York (state)
Houses in Binghamton, New York
Houses on the National Register of Historic Places in New York (state)
Houses completed in 1854
Carpenter Gothic houses in New York (state)
National Register of Historic Places in Broome County, New York